Farthest neighbor may refer to:
 Farthest neighbor graph in geometry
 The farthest neighbor method for calculating distances between clusters in hierarchical clustering.

See also 
 Nearest neighbor (disambiguation)